Annette Groth (born 16 February 1952 in Oslo) is a Norwegian journalist working for the Norwegian Broadcasting Corporation.

She worked in Agderposten, Aftenposten and Nationen before landing a job in the Norwegian Broadcasting Corporation in 1976. She served as their correspondent in London from 1991 to 2000, before she headed the news review Dagsrevyen from 2001 to 2004. In 2007 she became their correspondent in Washington, DC. Her tenure ended in 2010. She took over as presenter of the foreign affairs special Urix together with Christian Borch.

References 

1952 births
Living people
Norwegian journalists
Norwegian women journalists
NRK people
Norwegian television reporters and correspondents
Norwegian expatriates in England
Norwegian expatriates in the United States
Norwegian television presenters
Norwegian women television presenters